Čachovice is a municipality and village in Mladá Boleslav District in the Central Bohemian Region of the Czech Republic. It has about 900 inhabitants.

Administrative parts
The village of Struhy is an administrative part of Čachovice.

Etymology
The village was named after a lord named Čach, who had a fortress here.

Geography
It lies in a flat agricultural land of the Jizera Table. The municipality is situated on the right bank of the Vlkava River.

History
The first written mention of Čachovice is from 1088, when it was donated to the Vyšehrad Chapter. From the early 15th century, for several generations, it was property of the Chlumský family. Around 1600, it was shortly owned by the royal chamber, then it often changed owners. From 1789 until the establishment of an independent municipality in 1850, Čachovice and Struhy was part od the Loučeň estate. Among its owners were the Thurn und Taxis family and during their rule Čachovice significantly developed. Struhy used to be more populated village than Čachovice until 1870, when a sugar factory was founded there, which meant building development and an influx of residents.

Sights
The main landmark is the Church of Saints Peter and Paul in Struhy. It is an early Baroque church from the 17th century.

Notable people
František Čáp (1913–1972), film director

References

External links

Villages in Mladá Boleslav District